Duke Township is one of thirteen townships in Harnett County, North Carolina, United States. The township had a population of 5,965 according to the 2000 census and is the largest township in Harnett County by population. It is a part of the Dunn Micropolitan Area, which is also a part of the greater Raleigh–Durham–Cary Combined Statistical Area (CSA) as defined by the United States Census Bureau.

Geographically, Duke Township occupies  in southeastern Harnett County.  The only incorporated municipality within Duke Township is Erwin.  The town of Erwin was also formerly known as Duke.

Townships in Harnett County, North Carolina
Townships in North Carolina